It was a Dacian fortified town.

References

Dacian fortresses in Hunedoara County